Didier Chambaron (born 12 October 1971) is a French professional football manager.

Career
Born in France, between 2007 and 2010, he coached the New Caledonia national football team.

References

External links
Profile at Soccerway.com
Profile at Soccerpunter.com

Living people
French football managers
New Caledonia national football team managers
Place of birth missing (living people)
1971 births